Drumheller is a town in the Red Deer River valley in the badlands of east-central Alberta, Canada.

Drumheller may also refer to:

Places

Canada
Drumheller (provincial electoral district), Alberta
Drumheller coalfield, Alberta
Drumheller Institution, a medium-security prison in Drumheller, Alberta
Drumheller Municipal Airport, an airport northwest of Drumheller, Alberta
Drumheller/Ostergard's Airport, an airport south southeast of Drumheller, Alberta
Drumheller-Stettler, a provincial electoral district (riding) in Alberta

United States
Drumheller, Washington, an extinct town in Franklin County, in the U.S. state of Washington
 Drumheller Channels National Natural Landmark in the Channeled Scablands of Washington

People
Grant Drumheller (fl. 1976–2008), American portrait, figurative and still life painter
Robert Drumheller (died 1998), American set decorator
Thomas Jesse Drumheller (1873–1954), American football player, lawyer and sheep rancher
Tyler Drumheller (1952–2015), Central Intelligence Agency (CIA) officer
Walter Drumheller (1878–1958), American track and field athlete and Olympian

Others
Drumheller Fountain, an outdoor fountain on the University of Washington campus, Seattle, Washington
HMCS Drumheller, a Flower-class corvette that served with the Royal Canadian Navy during the Second World War